Abelmoschus moschatus (Abelmosk, ambrette, annual hibiscus, Bamia Moschata, Galu Gasturi, muskdana, musk mallow, musk okra, ornamental okra, rose mallow, tropical jewel hibiscus, Yorka okra) is an aromatic and medicinal plant in the family Malvaceae native to Asia and Australia.

Characteristics
The seeds have a sweet, flowery, heavy fragrance similar to that of musk (hence its specific epithet , scientific Latin for ‘musk’).

Despite its tropical origin, the plant is frost-hardy.

Uses of the plant

Musk mallow seed oil was once frequently used as a substitute in perfumes for animal musk; however this use is now mostly replaced by various synthetic musks due to its high cost.

In her 1705 book the Metamorphosis Insectorum Surinamensium, Maria Sibylla Merian described how the young indigenous women would string the seeds on threads and wear the seeds as decoration on their arms. She also indicated that the Indigenous people used the seeds to fatten up their chickens.

Culinary uses
It has many culinary uses. The seeds are added to coffee; unripe pods ("musk okra"), leaves and new shoots are eaten as vegetables.

Medicinal uses

Different parts of the plant have uses in Ayurveda herbal medicine, including as an antispasmodic and to treat gonorrhea. However, use may result in phytophotodermatitis and it has not been proven safe for use during pregnancy and lactation.

Other uses
In industry the root mucilage provides sizing for paper; tobacco is sometimes flavoured with the flowers.

References

External links
Abelmoschus moschatus
Abelmoschus moschatus
Abelmoschus moschatus Medicinal Plant Images Database (School of Chinese Medicine, Hong Kong Baptist University)  
Celtnet Spice Guide entry for Musk Mallow seeds, including recipes

moschatus
Flora of China
Flora of Taiwan
Flora of tropical Asia
Flora of Australia
Plants used in Ayurveda